Aaron Phillip Stinnie (born February 18, 1994) is an American football guard for the Tampa Bay Buccaneers of the National Football League (NFL). He played college football at James Madison.

Early life and high school
Stinnie was born and grew up in Charlottesville, Virginia and attended St. Anne's-Belfield School. He focused on basketball and did not begin playing football until his junior year after joining the team at the insistence of his friends.

College career
After redshirting his freshman season, Stinnie began his career with the Dukes as a defensive lineman, recording 11 tackles and 1.5 sacks in 12 games in his first season of playing time, before moving over to the offensive line going into his redshirt sophomore season. Stinnie became a three-year starter for JMU, starting 42 consecutive games to end his career, and was an FCS All-America selection for his redshirt junior and senior seasons.

Professional career

Tennessee Titans
Stinnie signed with the Tennessee Titans as an undrafted free agent on April 28, 2018 and made the final 53-man roster out of training camp. Stinnie made his NFL debut, the only regular season appearance of his rookie season, on October 21, 2018 against the Los Angeles Chargers.

On August 31, 2019, Stinnie was waived by the Titans and was signed to the practice squad the next day. He was promoted to the active roster on September 7, 2019 before the season opener. He was waived on November 9.

Tampa Bay Buccaneers
On November 11, 2019, Stinnie was claimed off waivers by the Tampa Bay Buccaneers. Stinnie appeared in five games, three with the Titans and two with the Buccaneers, during the 2019 season. Stinnie appeared in six games during the 2020 regular season. Stinnie made his first professional start in the Divisional Round of the playoffs against the New Orleans Saints after starting right guard Alex Cappa fractured his ankle in the Wild Card Round. He started the final three games of the playoffs, including Super Bowl LV as the Buccaneers beat the Kansas City Chiefs.

Stinnie signed a contract extension with the Buccaneers on March 17, 2021. He made his first career regular season start in Week 12 in place of an injured Ali Marpet. He suffered a knee injury in that game and was placed on injured reserve on December 1, 2021. He was activated on January 8, 2022.

On March 13, 2022, Stinnie re-signed with the Buccaneers. He suffered a torn ACL in the preseason and was placed on injured reserve on August 22, 2022.

On March 15, 2023, Stinnie re-signed with the Buccaneers.

Personal life
Stinnie's father, Phil Stinnie, played college basketball at Virginia Commonwealth and is seventh on the school's all-time scoring list.

References

External links
Tampa Bay Buccaneers bio
James Madison Dukes bio

1994 births
Living people
American football offensive guards
Sportspeople from Charlottesville, Virginia
Players of American football from Virginia
James Madison Dukes football players
Tennessee Titans players
Tampa Bay Buccaneers players